Jack Splash is an American recording artist, musician, songwriter, and record producer from Los Angeles, California. Splash's works include writing and production on singles for artists such as Alicia Keys, Kendrick Lamar, J. Cole, John Legend, CeeLo Green, Mayer Hawthorne, Goodie Mob, Ras Kass, B.o.B, R. Kelly, Pixie Lott, Christina Aguilera, Jazmine Sullivan, Jennifer Hudson, Melanie Fiona, Musiq Soulchild, K. Michelle, Keyshia Cole, Anthony Hamilton, Dirt Nasty, Estelle, Elijah Blake, Groove Armada, Zap Mama, Solange Knowles, Raheem DeVaughn, Natasha Bedingfield, Lemar, Kelis, Katy Perry, Missy Elliott, Mary J. Blige, Sia and Valerie June.

Career

2003–2008: Plantlife 
Before working as a music producer for other artists, Jack Splash produced and was the lead singer of an underground funk band from Los Angeles called Plantlife. In November 2004, Plantlife released their debut album The Return of Jack Splash via several different independent record labels internationally. Noted UK BBC Radio 1 DJ Gilles Peterson was one of the first early supporters of the band. The Return of Jack Splash was nominated and subsequently won Album of the Year at Peterson's Worldwide Awards in 2004. The album received critically acclaim; HipHopDX gave the album a rating of 9.5/10 and called it "incredibly funky funk from the soul". In 2008, Plantlife released their second album Time Traveller on Decon Records. The album was also critically acclaimed, with Pitchfork rating the album a 7.9/10 and writing that "singer/producer Jack Splash draws from Prince, Parliament-Funkadelic, The Ohio Players, and Rick James on a well-crafted love letter to funk."

2008–present: Production work 

After touring internationally with Plantlife, Splash began producing for several artists whom he met while on the road. The first artist he met and produced outside of his own band was CeeLo Green. To date, Jack Splash has been nominated for eleven Grammys and won three. In 2008 Splash won a Grammy for Best R&B Album for Jennifer Hudson's album Jennifer Hudson. That same year, the Jack Splash-produced song "I'm His Only Woman" (performed by Hudson and Fantasia) was nominated for Best R&B Performance by a Duo or Group. In 2009, Splash was nominated for Best Contemporary R&B Album for Jazmine Sullivan's Fearless. In 2010, Splash was again nominated for Best R&B Album for Anthony Hamilton's The Point of It All. In 2011, Splash's production for CeeLo Green "Fool for You" (featuring Melanie Fiona) won two Grammy Awards for Best R&B Song and Best Traditional R&B Performance. Also in 2011, Splash was again nominated for Best Contemporary R&B Album for his work on R. Kelly's Untitled. In 2012 Splash received another Grammy nomination for Melanie Fiona's "Wrong Side of a Love Song" for Best Traditional R&B Performance. In 2013, the Jack Splash-produced song "Now or Never" (written by Kendrick Lamar, Jack Splash and Jazmine Sullivan, and performed by Lamar and Mary J. Blige) was nominated for Best Rap/Sung Collaboration; Splash was also one of the producers nominated for two additional Grammys for Album of the Year and Best Rap Album for Lamar's Good Kid, M.A.A.D. City album.

In 2014, Splash took a short hiatus from producing for artists to focus on two of his side projects. The first group he formed with R&B singer Bobby Caldwell, Cool Uncle, released its debut album in 2015. Rolling Stone called the album "2015's Smartest Retro-Soul Revival" and Pitchfork selected the Cool Uncle song "Break Away" (featuring Jessie Ware) as one of the best tracks of 2015. The second side group, Semi Hendrix, was formed in 2014 with Los Angeles hip hop musician Ras Kass. The duo released their debut album Breakfast at Banksy's in 2015 via Mello Music Group. The Semi Hendrix album featured guest appearances from artists including CeeLo Green, Kurupt, Teedra Moses, Ras Austin, Taj Austin, Alice Russell and Wrekonize. The title track, "Breakfast at Banksy's", features a video directed by Jay Brown and animated by Ruffmercy. In 2016 the song was used to launch a Samsung Galaxy S7 television campaign.

In 2017 Splash resumed producing for other artists and released an album with Atlantic Records artist Lauriana Mae titled Can't Go Back, featuring guest appearances from artists including Dreezy, Raekwon from Wu-Tang Clan, and Manolo Rose. Also in 2017, after seeing them perform on both the Late Show with David Letterman and NPR's Tiny Desk Concerts, Splash began working with St. Paul and The Broken Bones from Alabama and produced the entirety of their album Young Sick Camellia, which was released via Sony Music on September 7, 2018. The album debuted at number four on the US Billboard Alternative Albums chart and also made the top 10 of the Top Rock Albums chart. The lead single from the album, "Apollo", was called "Prince-worthy funk" by Rolling Stone. The song spent 20 weeks in the top 20 on Billboards Adult Alternative Songs chart and peaked at number three on November 3, 2018, making it the band's first top-five Billboard radio airplay ranking. St. Paul & The Broken Bones performed several Jack Splash-produced songs on both The Jimmy Kimmel Show and Late Night with Seth Meyers.

In 2018, again after seeing an NPR Tiny Desk performance, Splash began working with the New Orleans band Tank and the Bangas. The band won NPR's 2017 Tiny Desk Contest. Splash produced several songs on Tank and the Bangas' major-label debut album Green Balloon, including the lead single "Ants". Green Balloon was released via Verve Records/Universal Music Group on May 3, 2019, and debuted at number three on Billboards Heatseakers Albums chart.

On August 2, 2019, another one of Jack Splash's side projects (Brothers Voodoo) had a demo of their song "Keep You Alive" featured in the film and on the soundtrack of Fast & Furious Presents: Hobbs & Shaw.

In October 2019, Jack Splash began working with actress and singer/songwriter Cynthia Erivo on her debut album for Verve Records/Universal Music Group.

On November 20, 2019, after receiving critical acclaim for their Jack Splash-produced album, Tank and the Bangas were nominated for Best New Artist at the 2020 Grammy Awards. Also in 2019, Jack Splash collaborated with Milwaukee singer-songwriter Jon Brown on another independent side project called Kill the Motherboard. The duo's first single "Waaaaay Gone" was premiered by Complex, and their second single "The Water" featuring Eric Biddines was premiered on HipHopDX. Their debut album The Legend of Picasso Jones was released via Empire Distribution on June 14, 2019.

Discography

Albums
 The Return of Jack Splash (with PlantLife) (2004)
 Time Traveller (with PlantLife) (2008)
 Heir to the Throne Vol. 1 (2009)
 King of the Beats Vol. 1 (2010)
 Cool Uncle (with Bobby Caldwell as Cool Uncle) (2015)
 Breakfast at Banksy's (with Ras Kass as Semi Hendrix) (2015)
 Can't Go Back (with Lauriana Mae) (2017)
 Young Sick Camellia (with St. Paul & The Broken Bones) (2018)
 Green Balloon (with Tank and The Bangas) (2019)
 The Legend of Picasso Jones (with Jon Brown as Kill The Motherboard) (2019)

Extended plays
 Extended Package (with Dirt Nasty as Chain Swangaz) (2011)

Production discography
Adapted from AllMusic.

References

External links

Living people
American funk singers
American male singer-songwriters
American male pop singers
American neo soul singers
Record producers from California
Grammy Award winners
Year of birth missing (living people)
Singer-songwriters from California